Rayanal is a village in Dharwad district of Karnataka, India.

Demographics 
As of the 2011 Census of India there were 534 households in Rayanal and a total population of 2,614 consisting of 1,339 males and 1,275 females. There were 305 children ages 0-6.

References

Villages in Dharwad district